The Great Lakes Engineering Works (GLEW) was a leading shipbuilding company with a shipyard in Ecorse, Michigan, that operated between 1902 and 1960. Within three years of its formation, it was building fifty percent of the tonnage of all ships in the Great Lakes. During World War II, GLEW was commissioned by Pittsburgh Steamship Company and the U.S. Maritime Commission to build twenty-one ore freighters. Its innovations included the first self-unloader freighter, SS Wyandotte.

History
The GLEW  was formed in 1902 to purchase Riverside Ironworks. Riverside was the short-lived successor to the venerable S.F. Hodge Company (Samuel F. Hodge & Company), which was  well known for quality steam engines and provided access not only to marine engine markets, but also to non marine markets as well. Because of the Hodge Company, which was founded in 1863, and other companies like them, the Detroit River community had become a hot bed for steam engine development. Antonio C. Pessano was elected as President and General Manager for his engineering background and charismatic personality. The new company realized that the Riverside yard had limited room and service docks. GLEW announced the purchase of a second shipyard in Ecorse, Michigan in 1903 which later became the River Rouge yard, named after its location on the River Rouge. The GLEW again expanded in 1905 when it acquired the Columbia Iron Works in St. Clair, Michigan, and in 1912 when operations began at their Ashtabula shipyard in Ohio. These GLEW shipyards helped Pressano realize his goal for the company.

It was anticipated that GLEW would be the largest shipbuilding plant on the Great Lakes.  In 1903, the plant owned eighty-five acres (34 ha) along the Detroit River that included  of river frontage. The company began with a capital of $1.5 million and a $500,000 bond issue. Within three years of GLEW's formation, Detroit built fifty percent of the tonnage of all ships in the Great Lakes.

The GLEW created opportunity for other companies and played a large wartime role during the company’s fifty-eight-year span.  Many shipping companies hoped that the skilled craftsmanship of the GLEW would help establish their firm as a major contender within the Great Lakes shipping industry. The Northwestern Mutual Insurance Company of Milwaukee contracted the GLEW to build the first ‘super freighter’ thus putting them on the map.  Other orders of the same magnitude ensued which benefited the local economy.  Hugh McElroy, general superintendent of the GLEW stated that these contracts presented 1,300 new jobs  and thereby tripling the company’s workforce. William Penn Snyder, president of Shenango Furnace Company of Sharpsville, Pennsylvania felt that the incorporation of GLEW ships would clearly change his smaller (by comparison) iron and steel industry into a leading competitor.  Just as Snyder had hoped, the record-breaking freighter, SS Shenango, helped  dramatically expand the company. This relationship between the two companies led to the contract of more ships whereby even Elizabeth Russel, daughter of John Russel, vice president and treasurer of GLEW had the honor of christening the SS William P. Snyder. Although the Snyder did not set records, the GLEW would become renowned via other vessels.

Construction achievements
The GLEW  set records and earned long-time standing recognition as a leading innovator in shipbuilding technology. In 1908, the SS Wyandotte was launched from the Ecorse site. This . steel hulled, self-unloader was the prototype for the modern day self-unloader. Again technology advanced and the newer ships of 1911 based their design on the Wyandotte but were incorporated with grander features. The GLEW designed and built seven new ships of “full canal dimensions and rather deep draft,” thereby forging the way for bigger and better products and production and pushed technology further.

The year 1925 marked a new technical era when GLEW built the  SS William C. Atwater at the River Rouge site at the request of Wilson Transit.  The Atwater was “the first ship with full-size hatches [that] have single-piece steel hatch covers” As machinery advanced, so did the size of the vessels.  By 1957, plans were made to build the largest ore carrier to maneuver the Lakes.

GLEW'S hull #301 was named . The new "Queen of the Lakes" was launched on June 7, 1958, from GLEW’s River Rouge shipyard. Mrs. Edmund Fitzgerald had the privilege of breaking the champagne bottle on Fitzgerald ’s bow. The event received wide spread media coverage. An estimated 15,000 people showed up to witness the event that marked the first new "maximum seaway-size" freighter on the Lakes. The Fitzgerald arguably became the most famous shipwreck in the history of Great Lakes shipping, made legendary by Gordon Lightfoot's popular ballad, the "Wreck of the Edmund Fitzgerald".

War
The war years not only saw the construction but also the destruction of vessels. During World War I, the SS Vacuum (Hull # 99, Ecorse yard) commissioned by Ocean Freight Cargo Ship in 1912 as the SS Bayamon was sunk by German torpedo April 28, 1917 near Scotland. The SS Gratangen (Hull #156, Ashtabula) commissioned by Corona Coa in 1916 as the SS Corona was sunk by German submarine in 1917.   The P. L. M. No. 4 (Hull #162,Ecorse) commissioned by the French government for the Paris, Lyon and Mediterranean Railway in 1916 was torpedoed and sunk in English Channel on December 27, 1917. However, the construction during wartime enabled the GLEW to bring economic prosperity to the Detroit area.

The Navy department appropriations bill for 1941 awarded Great Lakes shipyards government contracts worth almost ninety million dollars. The GLEW was responsible for twenty-one new ore carriers commissioned by the Pittsburgh Steamship Company and the U.S. Maritime Commission. As the year came to an end, more military orders from Washington came in when the Great Lakes shipyards were already operating at full capacity. The shipbuilders  met the increased demand by expanding and creating new ways to heighten production levels that resulted in the larger, deeper vessels. Some of the vessels became casualties of war. The SS Catherine (hull # 219 from GLEW Ecorse) was commissioned by U.S. Maritime Commission as the SS Covedale in May 1919. She was torpedoed by Germans on June 17, 1941. The supply and demands were met but when peace came, the over-abundance of shipbuilding orders decreased and so too did the local economies of the once booming, small Great Lakes ports. The role of delivering bulk commodities could not change for GLEW’s vessels and therefore they were valued whether at war or at peace. It was the decrease in shipbuilding orders that troubled the local economy and marked the end of an era.

Decline
GLEW’s 58-year history saw the end to their own epoch. Foreign firms started producing cost-cheap ships therefore, the America steamship companies began dealing abroad.  On April 30, 1961, GLEW stockholders agreed to dissolve the shipbuilding giant and sell it to the Great Lakes Steel Corporation.

Ships built 
Examples:
 :Category:Ships built in Ecorse, Michigan
SS William G. Mather (1905)
SS William G. Mather (1925)
SS John Mitchell (1906)
SS William B. Davock
SS Thomas F. Cole
SS B.F. Jones
SS Willis L. King
SS South American
SS North American
SS J.H. Sheadle
James L. Kuber
Mississagi
SS Cedarville
 SS Delphine (1921)
SS Alpena (1942)
SS Frank C. Ball
SS William Clay Ford
  (1958)
 Vacationland a State of Michigan Ferry in 1952
 For World War II, in 1943 built L6-S-B1 Lakers: 	
Pilot Knob/Frank Armstrong 	
Clarence B. Randall 	
J. H. Hillman, Jr. 	
Pilot Knob/Steelton
Adirondack/Richard J. Reiss 	
Lake Angelina/Cadillac 
Hill Annex/George A. Sloan 	
McIntyre/Frank Purnell
Robert C. Stanley 	
Mesabi/Lehigh

References

External links

Guide to Great Lakes Engineering Works. Drawings, 1919. 5191G. Kheel Center for Labor-Management Documentation and Archives, Martin P. Catherwood Library, Cornell University.
The Great Lakes Engineering Works: The Shipyard And Its Vessels (Marine Historical Society of Detroit)

Shipyards of the United States
Defunct shipbuilding companies of the United States
Industrial buildings and structures in Michigan
Ecorse, Michigan
Defunct manufacturing companies based in Michigan